Events from the year 1840 in Ireland.

Events
10 January – Uniform Penny Post introduced.
1 April – Theatre Royal, Cork burns down.
19 May – foundation stone of the Roman Catholic St Mel's cathedral, Longford, is laid.
10 July – General Assembly of the Presbyterian Church in Ireland established.
28 July – first permanent presence of the Church of Jesus Christ of Latter-day Saints in Ireland when Mormon missionaries John Taylor, William Black and James McGuffie arrive to work in the Newry, Lisburn and Belfast areas. On 31 July Thomas Tait becomes the first convert baptised in Ireland, at Loughbrickland.
The Palm House in Belfast Botanic Gardens is completed, constructed by Richard Turner of Dublin. It is one of the earliest examples of a curvilinear cast iron glasshouse in the world.
Bewley's established as tea and coffee importers.

Arts and literature
Edward Bunting's The Ancient Music of Ireland is published, incorporating "A Dissertation on the Irish Harp and Harpers, Including an Account of the Old Melodies of Ireland".

Births
1 January – Patrick Walsh, journalist, politician and mayor of Augusta, Georgia (died 1899).
4 January – Bishop Richard Owens, Bishop of Clogher 1894–1909 (died 1909).
8 January – Henry Arthur Blake, British colonial administrator and Governor of Hong Kong (died 1918).
17 January – William Pery, 3rd Earl of Limerick, peer (died 1896).
27 February – Thomas Kelly-Kenny, British Army general who served in the Second Boer War (died 1914).
29 February – John Philip Holland, engineer, developed the first Royal Navy submarine (died 1914).
25 March – Myles Keogh, officer in American Civil War, later in U.S. 7th Cavalry Regiment, killed at the Battle of the Little Bighorn (died 1876).
26 April (bapt.) – Paddy Hannan, gold prospector whose discovery in 1893 near Kalgoorlie, Western Australia set off a gold rush (died 1925).
27 April – Tom Gallaher, tobacco manufacturer (died 1927).
23 May – George Throssell, second Premier of Western Australia (died 1910).
20 September – Ellen Mary Clerke, author, journalist, poet and science writer (died 1906).
1 November – Arthur Guinness, 1st Baron Ardilaun, businessman, politician, and philanthropist (died 1915).
17 November – Lawrence Parsons, 4th Earl of Rosse, eighteenth Chancellor of Trinity College, Dublin (d.(1908).
28 December – Thomas Hovenden, artist and teacher (died 1895).
Full date unknown
William Abraham, Irish Nationalist MP (died 1915).
Timothy J. Campbell, Democrat U.S. Representative from New York (died 1904).
Timothy H. O'Sullivan, photographer in the United States (died 1882)

Deaths
15 April – Thomas Drummond, military surveyor and Under-Secretary for Ireland (born 1797 in Scotland).
21 April – Standish O'Grady, 1st Viscount Guillamore, Lord Chief Baron of the Exchequer in Ireland (born 1766).
12 June – Gerald Griffin, novelist, poet and playwright (born 1803).
20 August – George Canning, 1st Baron Garvagh, politician (born 1778).

References

 
1840s in Ireland
Ireland
Years of the 19th century in Ireland